is a private museum of artefacts handed down by the Kikkawa clan, daimyō of Iwakuni Domain, in Iwakuni, Yamaguchi Prefecture, Japan. There are four changing displays each year. Other materials once owned by the Kikkawa clan are on display at Iwakuni Chōkokan.

Highlights of the collection
 , from the Kamakura period (National Treasure)
 , from the Momoyama period; said to have been bestowed upon Kikkawa Hiroie by Toyotomi Hideyoshi in 1587 after his campaign in Kyūshū (Important Cultural Property)
 : 102 items dating from the Kamakura to the Edo period (ICP); a further 32 items, plus a catalogue, from the Meiji period (Municipal Tangible Cultural Property)
 Azuma Kagami: 48 volumes, from the Muromachi period (1522) (ICP)
 Taiheiki: 40 volumes, in the hand of Kikkawa Motoharu, from the Muromachi period (1563–65) (ICP)
 Portrait of

See also

 List of National Treasures of Japan (crafts: swords)
 List of Cultural Properties of Japan - paintings (Yamaguchi)
 List of Historic Sites of Japan (Yamaguchi)
 Yamaguchi Prefectural Museum and Museum of Art
 Iwakuni Art Museum
 Mōri Museum

References

External links
  Kikkawa Historical Museum

Iwakuni, Yamaguchi
Museums in Yamaguchi Prefecture
History museums in Japan
Museums established in 1995
1995 establishments in Japan